Huachucocha or Huachococha (possibly from Quechua wachu furrow slice, ridge turned up by the plough between two furrows / row, qucha lake) is a lake in Peru east of the Cordillera Blanca at a mountain of the same name. It is situated in the Ancash Region, Carlos Fermín Fitzcarrald Province, San Luis District.

See also 
 Yanamayo

References

Lakes of Peru
Lakes of Ancash Region
Mountains of Peru
Mountains of Ancash Region